Pataha is a small, unincorporated community in Garfield County, Washington, United States.  It located about 4 miles east of  Pomeroy, the Garfield County seat. Pataha is home to the historic Houser Mill, a working water-powered flour mill originally built in 1879.

History
The town is located on the Pataha Creek along the Nez Perce trail.  This was the path used by the Nez Perce Native Americans for crossing the Rocky Mountains.  The name Pataha is from the Nez Perce word for 'brush', as there was dense brush along both sides of the creek.

In May 1806, Lewis and Clark passed through and spent the night here on their return journey from the Pacific coast.  In 1834, Captain B. L. E. Bonneville passed through the area doing survey work for the US Government.  In 1861, James Bowers settled on the site of Pataha.  The next year a stagecoach line was established between Walla Walla and Lewiston which passed through the area, bringing many more settlers.  These first settlers were mainly engaged in farming vegetables and cattle ranching, but this would give way to wheat farming in the 1870s.  The area began to grow as a town in 1878, and was officially platted in 1882 by Angevine Titus and Company Favor.  The town was briefly known as both 'Favorsburg' and 'Watertown', but the original native placename Pataha would prevail.

Pataha grew into a successful town, rivalling nearby Pomeroy for some time.  Pataha was briefly the county seat when Garfield County was created in 1881.  The Pataha Spirit newspaper was also established this same year.  When the Oregon Railroad and Navigation Company brought a rail line to Pomeroy in 1885, the line was not extended to Pataha.  Soon the town lost its competitive edge over its neighbor and began to decline.  The flour mill continued to run until 1940.

References 

Unincorporated communities in Garfield County, Washington
Unincorporated communities in Washington (state)